1 Giant Leap is the debut album by English electronic music duo 1 Giant Leap. Beginning in October 1999, its two members, Jamie Catto and Duncan Bridgeman, travelled across the world for six months to record vocals and music by various vocalists and musicians from Senegal, Ghana, South Africa, Uganda, India, Nepal, Sikkim, Thailand, Australia, New Zealand and the United States, before returning to London in March 2000. The album was released on DVD in September 2002.

Track listing

Personnel

1 Giant Leap
Jamie Catto, Duncan Bridgeman – All instruments

Vocalists featured
Robbie Williams – vocals
Maxi Jazz – raps
Neneh Cherry – vocals
Michael Stipe – vocals
Horace Andy – vocals
Asha Bhosle – vocals
Baaba Maal – vocals
Mahotella Queens – vocals
Grant Lee Phillips – vocals
Whirimako Black – vocals
Eddi Reader – vocals
Ram Dass – spoken word
Ulali – vocals, spoken word
Tom Robbins – spoken word
Kurt Vonnegut, Jr. – spoken word
Michael Franti – poetry
Dana Gillespie – chant

Other musicians
Dave Randall – guitar
Nigel Butler – guitar, programming and mixing
Sanjay Kumar – guitar
DJ Swamp – turntables
Ronu Majumdar – flute
Lévon Minassian – duduk
Pops Mohamed – percussion, kora, bird calls, effects
Ayub Ogada – nyatiti
Eddie Quansah – trumpet
Bada Seck – djembe, sabar
Goetz Botzenhardt – mixing engineer
Tim Clark – executive producer
Tony Cousins – mastering
Suzette Newman – executive producer

Charts

References

External links
Review at bbc.co.uk
2003 article in Sound on Sound magazine on recording the album
 1 Giant Leap website
 What About Me? website

1 Giant Leap albums
2002 debut albums
Palm Pictures albums
Worldbeat albums